La Marche may refer to:

 La Marche (cave), an archaeological cave site in Vienne, France
 La Marche, Nièvre, France
 La Marche, Cavaellon, Haiti, a village in the Cavaellon commune of Haiti
 March (territory), or La Marche in French
 County of La Marche, a medieval French county
 La Marche (film), a 2013 French film